Nambour Crushers Rugby League Football Club is an Australian rugby league football club based in Nambour, Queensland formed in 1955. The club was established when two Nambour local teams merge; South Magpies and the All Whites.

Notable Juniors
Ray Higgs (1975-78 Parramatta Eels & Manly Sea Eagles)
Ben Ross (2002-13 St George Illawarra Dragons, Penrith Panthers, Cronulla Sharks & South Sydney Rabbitohs)
Joe Boyce (2015- Brisbane Broncos)

References

External links  
 Official website

Sport in the Sunshine Coast, Queensland
Rugby league teams in Queensland
Rugby clubs established in 1968
1968 establishments in Australia
Nambour, Queensland